The US National Center for Atmospheric Research (NCAR ) is a US federally funded research and development center (FFRDC) managed by the nonprofit University Corporation for Atmospheric Research (UCAR) and funded by the National Science Foundation (NSF). NCAR has multiple facilities, including the I. M. Pei-designed Mesa Laboratory headquarters in Boulder, Colorado. Studies include meteorology, climate science, atmospheric chemistry, solar-terrestrial interactions, environmental and societal impacts.

Tools and technologies 

NCAR was instrumental in developing lidar, light radar, now a key archaeological tool, as well as providing a broad array of tools and technologies to the scientific community for studying Earth’s atmosphere, including,
 Specialized instruments to measure atmospheric processes
 Research aircraft yawa
 High-performance computing and cyberinfrastructure, including supercomputers
 Mauna Loa Solar Observatory
 Cooperative field campaigns
 Atmospheric models of weather, chemical, solar, and climate processes, including cooperatively developed models such as:
 Community Earth System Model (CESM)
 Weather Research and Forecasting model (WRF)
 Whole Atmosphere Community Climate Model (WACCM)
 Technology transfer to support societal needs
 Data sets, data services, and other resources
 NCAR Command Language (NCL), a programming language designed for use with climate and model data

Staffing areas and notable past and present scientists 

The center is staffed by scientists, engineers, technicians, and support personnel. Key research areas include:

 Climate (Earth’s past, present, and future climate; the greenhouse effect, global warming, and climate change; El Niño, La Niña, and other large-scale atmospheric patterns; drought, wildfires)
 Meteorology/Weather (short-term forecasts; weather forecasting and predictability; weather's effect on climate; hurricanes, tornadoes, and other severe storms; physical processes)
 Environmental and societal impacts (impacts of climate change on the natural and managed environment; interactions of weather, climate, and society; weather hazard systems for aviation and ground transportation; national security)
 Pollution and air chemistry (air pollution on local, regional, and global scales; air chemistry and climate; chemical evolution and transport in the atmosphere)
 the Sun and space weather (the structure of the Sun, from its interior to sunspots to the solar corona; the solar cycle; the Sun’s effect on Earth’s weather and climate; space weather)
 Other components of the Earth system (the effects on weather and climate of interactions with: the oceans and other components of Earth's water cycle, including sea ice, glaciers, and the rest  of the cryosphere; forests, agriculture, urbanization and other types of land use)

Notable scientists on the current staff at the center include Tom Wigley, Kevin Trenberth, Clara Deser, and Caspar Ammann, and in past have included Paul Crutzen (Nobel Prize in chemistry, 1995); Paul Julian, who with colleague Roland Madden discovered the Madden–Julian oscillation; Stephen Schneider . Greg Holland initiated the multiscale modeling project "Predicting the Earth System Across Scales".

Organization of research—laboratories and programs 

NCAR is currently organized into seven laboratories and two programs:

Laboratories
 Atmospheric Chemistry Observations and Modeling laboratory (ACOM)
 Climate and Global Dynamics laboratory (CGD)
 Computational & Information Systems Laboratory (CISL)—CISL was formerly known as the Scientific Computing Division (SCD).  CISL manages and operates NCAR's supercomputers, mass storage system, networking, and other computing and cyberinfrastructure services. The Institute for Mathematics Applied to Geosciences (IMAGe) is a research division within CISL.
 Earth Observing Laboratory (EOL)—EOL was formerly known as the Atmospheric Technology Division (ATD). EOL manages and operates NCAR's lower atmosphere observing systems, including ground-based instrumentation and two research aircraft, on behalf of the NSF.
 High Altitude Observatory (HAO)—The oldest part of NCAR, HAO is NCAR's solar-terrestrial physics laboratory. Research foci are the Sun and the Earth's upper atmosphere. HAO operates the Mauna Loa Solar Observatory (MLSO). 
 Mesoscale and Microscale Meteorology laboratory (MMM)
 Research Applications Laboratory (RAL)

Programs
 Advanced Study Program (ASP)
 Integrated Science Program (ISP)

NCAR's service to the universities and larger geosciences community is reinforced by the offerings of UCAR's community programs.

Funding and management 
NCAR is managed by the nonprofit UCAR and is one of the NSF's Federally Funded Research and Development Centers, with approximately 95% of its funding coming from the federal government. However, it is not a federal agency and its employees are not part of the federal personnel system. NCAR employs about 761 staff. Its annual expenditures in fiscal year 2015 were $167.8 million.

NCAR directors 
The founding director of NCAR was Walter Orr Roberts. The current director is Everette Joseph.

Visiting

Scientific visitors 

NCAR has many opportunities for scientific visits to the facilities for workshops, colloquia, and collaboration by colleagues in academia, government labs, and the private sector. Many NCAR staff also visit colleagues at universities and labs and serve as adjunct or visiting faculty.

Public tours 

The Visitor Center at the Mesa Laboratory is open to the public daily at no charge. Guided tours and self-guided tablet tours include video and audio on one of the first supercomputers built by Seymour Cray as well as NCAR's modern supercomputer fleet, many hands-on educational exhibits demonstrating weather phenomena and the changes in Earth's climate brought on by global warming, and a scenic outdoor weather trail.

References

External links
 
 Public tours & exhibits, at the University Corporation for Atmospheric Research
 High-end Computing at NCAR, at the Computational and Information Systems Laboratory
 NCAR Archives
 NCAR Research Data Archive (RDA)
 OpenSky Repository

Air pollution organizations
Meteorology and climate education
Meteorological research institutes
Federally Funded Research and Development Centers
Supercomputer sites
Earth science research institutes
Research institutes in Colorado
Companies based in Boulder, Colorado
I. M. Pei buildings
Environmental research institutes